Raul Lô Gonçalves  (born 11 July 1996), simply known as Raul, is a Brazilian footballer who plays as central midfielder for Red Bull Bragantino.

Club career

Ceará
Raul was born in Tauá but was raised in Arneiroz, and was released from Icasa's youth setup at the age of 15. He subsequently represented Eco Suzano before joining Ceará in 2013.

Raul made his first team debut on 15 July 2015, coming on as a second-half substitute for João Marcos in a 0–0 home draw against Tupi, for the year's Copa do Brasil. In the following year, he was definitely promoted to the main squad.

Raul became a regular starter during the 2017 season, scoring the second in a 2–0 home win against Ferroviário-CE which ensured his club the Campeonato Cearense. He contributed with 31 league matches during the campaign, as his side achieved promotion to the Série A.

Vasco da Gama
On 15 May 2018, after rejecting a renewal offer from Ceará, Raul agreed to a pre-contract with Vasco da Gama. He was officially announced by his new club on 1 June, signing until 2020.

Raul made his Série A debut on 9 June 2018, replacing Giovanni Augusto in a 3–2 home defeat of Sport Recife.

Honours
Ceará
Campeonato Cearense: 2017, 2018

References

External links
Vasco da Gama profile 

1996 births
Living people
Sportspeople from Ceará
Brazilian footballers
Association football midfielders
Campeonato Brasileiro Série A players
Campeonato Brasileiro Série B players
Ceará Sporting Club players
CR Vasco da Gama players
Red Bull Bragantino players
People from Tauá